Javier San Román Celorio (born January 27, 1987) is a Mexican football manager, executive and former player. He is the brother of the former football player and executive Santiago San Román.

Footballer
His career as a professional footballer lasted five years between 2007 and 2012, playing for Teca Huixquilucan and Tecamachalco F.C., both in the Segunda División de México.

Football executive
In 2012 he retired from professional soccer after his club was promoted to Ascenso MX, however, the team was remodeled to comply with the competition regulations, later, the club was relocated to Oaxaca City and renamed as Alebrijes de Oaxaca however, the club ownership continued under the Grupo Tecamachalco. At the end of 2012 San Román was appointed as the first president of the club. On April 16, 2016, San Román resigned as president of Alebrijes de Oaxaca.

In 2016, the Grupo Tecamachalco signed an agreement with the Grupo Orlegi to bring Tampico Madero F.C. to Ascenso MX, as part of the agreement Javier San Román was appointed as the president of this club. He remained in office until April 2018, when San Román resigned in protest for the lower numbers of clubs approved from get the promotion from Ascenso MX to Liga MX and a possible elimination of the promotion right.

After Tampico Madero, San Román returned to Oaxaca to be part of the club's board of directors, until 2019 when it was decided to put the franchise on hiatus with the aim of getting another place due to the loss of support of the fans and the low economic support from the government.

For the 2020–2021 season, Grupo Tecamachalco began a synergy with Club Deportivo Irapuato with the aim of ensuring the club's continuity in the city. As part of the agreement, San Román was appointed as the club's president. In December 2020 the club dismissed its manager Juan Manuel Rivera due to poor sporting results, due to lack of time to find another coach it was decided to appoint Javier San Román as the new manager of the club, so he resigned from the presidency of the same.

Manager
San Román officially debuted as manager on January 16, 2021, in his first game, Irapuato drew two goals with Cruz Azul Hidalgo. In the eleven regular-phase matches that he directed, the club achieved seven victories, three draws and one defeat, for which he managed to qualify the team for promotion play-offs to Liga de Expansión MX. In the playoffs, San Román managed to eliminate C.F. La Piedad in the quarterfinals by an aggregate score of 5–2, in the semifinals he defeated Inter Playa del Carmen with an aggregate of 1–2, however, in this last game he was expelled and sanctioned for eight games due to unsportsmanlike conduct. Later, Irapuato defeated Cruz Azul Hidalgo in the final by an aggregate of 1–3, with which the club won the championship and category promotion, however, San Román had to witness the series from the stands.

Honours

Manager 

Irapuato

 Liga Premier de México: 2020–21

Managerial statistics
.

References

1987 births
Living people
Footballers from Mexico City
Mexican footballers
Association football defenders
Liga Premier de México players
Mexican football managers
Irapuato F.C. managers
Liga Premier de México managers